Huang Wei (born 29 October 1993) is a Chinese professional footballer who currently plays for Beijing BSU in the China League One.

Club career
Huang Wei started his football career with FC Metz and joined C.D. Mafra in 2012 as a youth player. In January 2013, Huang moved to Benfica B after successfully passing his trial with the club. On 28 April 2013, he made his debut for the club against Arouca in a 1–1 draw. Afterwards, Huang played in every match for the club for the remainder of the 2012–13 season.

On 20 July 2014, Huang transferred to Segunda Liga side S.C. Farense. On 27 August 2014, he debuted for Farense in a 1–0 win against Oriental Lisboa.

On 27 February 2015, Huang transferred to Chinese Super League side Shanghai Shenxin. He made his debut for the club on 15 March 2015, playing the whole match in a 2–0 home loss against Shanghai SIPG. He played 13 league matches in the 2015 season; however, Shanghai Shenxin finished the bottom and relegated to the second tier.

Huang moved to LigaPro side Leixões on 7 July 2017. On 26 July 2018, he joined fellow LigaPro side Vitória Guimarães B, signing a two-year contract.

Career statistics
Statistics accurate as of match played 31 December 2020.

References

External links

1993 births
Living people
Association football defenders
FC Metz players
C.D. Mafra players
S.L. Benfica B players
S.C. Farense players
Shanghai Shenxin F.C. players
Leixões S.C. players
Vitória S.C. B players
Sichuan Longfor F.C. players
Beijing Sport University F.C. players
Liga Portugal 2 players
Chinese Super League players
China League One players
Chinese footballers
Sportspeople from Kunming
Footballers from Yunnan
Chinese expatriate footballers
Expatriate footballers in Portugal
Chinese expatriate sportspeople in Portugal